Gruene Hall, built in 1878 by Henry (Heinrich) D. Gruene and located in the historical town of Gruene, Texas (now a part of New Braunfels), bills itself as "the oldest continually run dance hall in Texas". By design, not much has physically changed since the hall was first built. The 6,000-square foot dance hall with a high-pitched tin roof still has the original layout with side flaps for open-air dancing, a bar in the front, a small lighted stage in the back and a huge outdoor garden. Advertisement signs from the 1930s and 1940s still hang in the old hall and around the stage.

Under the current ownership, Gruene Hall has become internationally recognized as a destination tourist attraction and major music venue for up-and-coming as well as established artists. Gruene Hall has hosted such acts as Garth Brooks, Willie Nelson, Merle Haggard, LeAnn Rimes, George Strait, Townes Van Zandt, Jerry Jeff Walker, Lyle Lovett, Hal Ketchum, and Gregg Allman. Tracie Ferguson, the booking agent of 30 years, is credited with starting the original music approach that has made Gruene Hall an iconic music venue, helping to jump-start the careers of Lovett, Townes Van Zandt, Ketchum, Bruce Robison, Nanci Griffith, Ryan Bingham, Jimmy Dale Gilmore, Robert Earl Keen, Lucinda Williams and many others.

Books
Gruene Hall has been featured in several books including the following...
Pat Green's Dance Halls and Dreamers – Luke Gilliam (2008) 978-0292718760
Texas Dance Halls: A Two Step Circuit - Gail Folkins (2007) 978-0896726031
The Great Towns of America - David and Joan Vokac (2009) 978-0930743109
1000 Places to See Before You Die - Patricia Schultz (2012) 978-0761156864

Films and photography
In 1996, It was also used as a set for Michael, starring John Travolta.

In 2006, Gruene Hall was shown in the movie Coyote Funeral.

In 2009, George Strait's album Twang CD cover and insert photos were taken at Gruene Hall.

In 2019, ZZ Top did interviews, and played live music for many parts of the documentary That Little ol' Band from Texas, at the dance hall. At the end of the documentary, they walk out to the front of the dancehall in Gruene, with clear view of some of the town, and drove off together into the horizon.

In 2021, Gruene Hall was shown on Landmarks: The Stages of Country Music TV Show Season 1, Episode 2.

Album and music video recordings

In 1989, Jerry Jeff Walker recorded his live album Jerry Jeff Walker - Live At Gruene Hall.

In 1994, Wade Hayes shot his country music video "Old Enough to Know Better" at Gruene Hall.

On November 16, 2016, George Strait gave a private surprise show at Gruene Hall, to perform a nearly two hour set in celebration of his then new album, Strait Out of the Box: Part 2.

On February 16, 2019, LeAnn Rimes recorded Rimes: Live at Gruene Hall during a live concert at Gruene Hall, which was released on April 13, 2019.

In 2022, Scotty McCreery filmed his music video "Damn Strait" at Gruene Hall. It holds a special meaning to McCreery due to he is a George Strait fan and its the venue is where George Strait started and where he got his record deal which launched his career. After the video was released George Strait gave it his approval. The song turned out to be a #1 on Country Radio for McCreery.

List of past performers

Josh Abbott Band
Gregg Allman
Asleep at the Wheel
David Ball
Pat Benatar
Dierks Bentley
Ryan Bingham
Clint Black
Garth Brooks
Gatemouth Brown
Junior Brown
Johnny Bush
Mark Chesnutt
Guy Clark
Guy Clark Jr.
David Allan Coe
Albert Collins
Kevin Costner & Modern West
Roger Creager
Charley Crockett
Rodney Crowell
Charlie Daniels
Bo Diddley
Amber Digby
Dixie Chicks
Casey Donahew
Steve Earle
Melissa Etheridge
Fabulous Thunderbirds
Radney Foster
Kevin Fowler
Jimmy Dale Gilmore
Pat Green
Patty Griffin
Nanci Griffith
Arlo Guthrie
Buddy Guy
Merle Haggard
Emmylou Harris
Wade Hayes
Levon Helm
John Hiatt
Hootie and the Blowfish
Ray Wylie Hubbard
Jack Ingram
Chris Isaak
Flaco Jimenez
Wynonna Judd
Robert Earl Keen
Reckless Kelly
Kentucky Thunder
Hal Ketchum
BB King
Randall King
Kris Kristofferson
Miranda Lambert
Jerry Lee Lewis
Little Feat
Lyle Lovett
Loretta Lynn
Los Lobos
Los Lonely Boys
Los Texmaniacs
Taj Mahal
Raul Malo
Ziggy Marley
The Mavericks
Delbert McClinton
Scotty McCreery
Augie Meyers
Midland
Mike and the Moonpies
Ronnie Milsap
Keb Mo
John Michael Montgomery
Cory Morrow
Michael Martin Murphy
Kacey Musgraves
Emilio Navaira
Willie Nelson
Aaron Neville
Nitty Gritty Dirt Band
Lee Roy Parnell
The Peterson Brothers
Poco
Ray Price
Charlie Pride
John Prine
Pure Prairie League
Dennis Quaid and the Sharks
Little Richard
LeAnn Rimes
Bruce Robison
Charlie Robison
Randy Rogers Band
Todd Rundgren
Leon Russell
Doug Sahm
Boz Scaggs
Billy Joe Shaver
Ricky Skaggs
Marty Stewart
George Strait
Doug Supernaw
Koko Taylor
Three Dog Night
Mel Tillis
Texas Tornados
Wayne Toups
Randy Travis
Travis Tritt
Ernest Tubb
Tanya Tucker
The Marshall Tucker Band
Jerry Jeff Walker
Colter Wall
The Wallflowers
Aaron Watson
Lucinda Williams
Lee Ann Womack
Dwight Yoakam
Eli Young Band
Townes Van Zandt
ZZ Top

See also

National Register of Historic Places listings in Comal County, Texas
Recorded Texas Historic Landmarks in Comal County

References

External links

Gruene Hall web site
Gruene Historic District web site

Music venues in Texas
New Braunfels, Texas
Buildings and structures in Comal County, Texas
Event venues established in 1878
Theatres completed in 1878
1878 establishments in Texas